Sofka Popova (née Kazandzhieva/Bulgarian: Казанджиева; born 15 August 1953) is a retired 100 metres runner from Bulgaria. She won three medals at the European Indoor Championships.

Achievements

References

Sports Reference

European Indoor Championships

1953 births
Living people
Bulgarian female sprinters
Athletes (track and field) at the 1980 Summer Olympics
Olympic athletes of Bulgaria
Olympic female sprinters
21st-century Bulgarian women
20th-century Bulgarian women
Universiade medalists in athletics (track and field)
Universiade silver medalists for Bulgaria